April 10 - Eastern Orthodox liturgical calendar - April 12

All fixed commemorations below are observed on April 24 by Eastern Orthodox Churches on the Old Calendar.

For April 11th, Orthodox Churches on the Old Calendar commemorate the Saints listed on March 29.

Saints

 Martyrs Processus and Martinian of Rome (c. 67)
 Hieromartyr Antipas of Pergamum, Bishop of Pergamon, disciple of St. John the Theologian (92)
 Hieromartyr Domninus (Domnion), Bishop of Salona in Dalmatia, and eight soldiers with him (c. 100)
 Saint Philip of Gortyna, Bishop of Gortyna on Crete (180)
 Venerable Pharmuthius the Recluse, Anchorite of Egypt (4th century)
 Venerable-Martyr Bacchus, of the Great Lavra of St. Sabbas the Sanctified (8th century)
 Venerable John, disciple of Venerable Gregory of Decapolis (820)
 Venerable Tryfaini and Matrona of Cyzicus.

Pre-Schism Western saints

 Saint Machai, a disciple of St Patrick who founded a monastery on the Isle of Bute in Scotland (5th century)
 Saint Isaac of Spoleto (Isaac of Monteluco), a Syrian monk who fled the Monophysite persecution and founded a monastery in Monteluco near Spoleto (c. 550)
 Saint Maedhog (Aedhan, Mogue), an abbot whose main monastery was Clonmore in Ireland (6th century)
 Saint Guthlac of Crowland, hermit of Crowland, England (714)  (see also: August 30)
 Saint Agericus (Aguy, Airy), Abbot of St Martin's in Tours (680)
 Saint Godebertha, a nun at Noyon and the first abbess of the convent founded there (c. 700)

Post-Schism Orthodox saints

 Saint George, founder of the Monastery of Saint John Chrysostomos, north of Koutsovendis, in Cyprus  (c. 1070)
 Venerable James, Abbot of Zhelezny Borok, Kostroma (1442), and his fellow ascetic St. James of Bryleevsk (15th century)
 Venerable Euthymius (1456) and Chariton (1509), Abbots of Syanzhema, Vologda.
 Saint Barsanuphius, Bishop of Tver (1576)
 Venerable Callinicus of Cernica (Kallinikos), Bishop of Rimnic in Romania (1868)

New martyrs and confessors

 New Martyrs Peter Zhukov and Prochorus Mikhailov, of Tver (1918)
 New Hieromartyr Nicholas Gavarin, Priest (1938)

Other commemorations

 Commemoration of the Appearance of the Most Holy Theotokos at Pochaev, and the Leaving of her sacred Footprint there ("the Footprint") (1340)
 Repose of Elder Eulogius of St. George Kellion, Mt. Athos (1948)

Icon gallery

Notes

References

Sources
 April 11 / April 24. Orthodox Calendar (pravoslavie.ru).
 April 24 / April 11. Holy Trinity Russian Orthodox Church (A parish of the Patriarchate of Moscow).
 April 11. OCA - The Lives of the Saints.
 The Autonomous Orthodox Metropolia of Western Europe and the Americas. St. Hilarion Calendar of Saints for the year of our Lord 2004. St. Hilarion Press (Austin, TX). p. 28.
 April 11. Latin Saints of the Orthodox Patriarchate of Rome.
 The Roman Martyrology. Transl. by the Archbishop of Baltimore. Last Edition, According to the Copy Printed at Rome in 1914. Revised Edition, with the Imprimatur of His Eminence Cardinal Gibbons. Baltimore: John Murphy Company, 1916. p. 102.
 Rev. Richard Stanton. A Menology of England and Wales, or, Brief Memorials of the Ancient British and English Saints Arranged According to the Calendar, Together with the Martyrs of the 16th and 17th Centuries. London: Burns & Oates, 1892. pp. 152–154.
Greek Sources
 Great Synaxaristes:  11 Απριλιου. Μεγασ Συναξαριστησ.
  Συναξαριστής. 11 Απριλίου. ecclesia.gr. (H Εκκλησια Τησ Ελλαδοσ). 
Russian Sources
  24 апреля (11 апреля). Православная Энциклопедия под редакцией Патриарха Московского и всея Руси Кирилла (электронная версия). (Orthodox Encyclopedia - Pravenc.ru).
  11 апреля (ст.ст.) 24 апреля 2013 (нов. ст.) . Русская Православная Церковь Отдел внешних церковных связей.

April in the Eastern Orthodox calendar